USS Clyde has been the name of two ships in the United States Navy.

 , a side wheel steamer, captured by the Union Navy as Neptune on 14 June 1863, which served though the remainder of the American Civil War.
 , served as a station tanker from 1944 until 1946.

Sources
 

United States Navy ship names